Aleksandra Olsza (8 December 1977) is a retired Polish tennis player. Her career highlights include winning of 1995 Wimbledon Championships in both girls' singles and doubles. At the 1996 US Open, Olsza defeated world No. 12, Magdalena Maleeva.

Achievements
 At the 1995 Wimbledon Championships, Olsza won titles in both girls' singles and girls' doubles (with Cara Black).
 At the 1996 US Open, Olsza defeated world No. 12 player Magdalena Maleeva in the first round.
 Olsza represented Poland at the 1996 Summer Olympics, but lost in the first round.

Equipment
Olsza used the Prince racquet model Precision 720.

WTA career finals

Doubles: 3 (3 losses)

ITF Circuit finals

Singles: 4 (1–3)

Doubles: 10 (5–5)

Junior Grand Slam finals

Singles (1–0)

Doubles (1–0)

References

External links
 
 
 
 
 

1977 births
Living people
Sportspeople from Katowice
Polish female tennis players
Olympic tennis players of Poland
Tennis players at the 1996 Summer Olympics
Wimbledon junior champions
Grand Slam (tennis) champions in girls' singles
Grand Slam (tennis) champions in girls' doubles
20th-century Polish women
21st-century Polish women